Pippa Black (born 16 October 1982) is an Australian actress. From 2005 to 2009, Black played Elle Robinson in the soap opera Neighbours. Black played Tonya in the NBC series Outsourced from 2010 to 2011.

Career
Black appeared in the television movie  in 2003. She then went on to appear in episodes of The Secret Life of Us and Last Man Standing. In September 2005, it was announced that Black had joined the cast of Neighbours as Elle Robinson. Black told Clare Rigden of TV Week that she was going to London for a working holiday when she learnt that she had got the part. Of joining the cast, she commented "I admit I was a little star struck turning up to Ramsay Street and meeting everybody, but they all bent over backwards to help out and settle my nerves." Black earned a nomination for Most Popular New Female Talent at the Logie Awards for her portrayal of Elle. She was also nominated for Best Actress at Cosmopolitan's Fun, Fearless Female Awards in 2009. In June 2009, Black quit Neighbours to pursue other projects. The actress later revealed she would be willing to return to the soap in the future.

Black was cast in Gemma Lee's short film The Wake, which premiered at the Palm Springs International Festival of Short Films in 2009. She then went on to appear in the independent film Emergence and was cast in an episode of City Homicide as Emily Rigby. Black and her former Neighbours co-star Sweeney Young portrayed a young couple in the music video for Jacob Butler's single "Coma". Of appearing in the video, Black stated "I really love the track, that's why I got on board. I've never appeared in a video clip before so it's nice to be involved in something with really relatable lyrics. I think the scenes that we shot are really dramatic and quite emotive with the music."

On 6 July 2010, it was announced Black had been cast in US comedy Outsourced. She replaced Jessica Gower in the role of Tonya, "an athletic, statuesque woman who runs a customer service center in India." NBC cancelled Outsourced after one season. In 2012, Black appeared as Carissa Gibson in the season 13 finale of Law & Order: Special Victims Unit. She also filmed her first leading role in the indie film My Funny Valentine, and joined the cast of feature film Lemon Tree Passage as Amelia Stone.

Black reprised her role of Elle Robinson in Neighbours for two guest appearances in September 2019 and July 2022.

Personal life
Black attended St Patrick's Primary School in Pakenham Victoria and she later became a Vice Captain at Beaconhills College. She deferred her Animal Technology studies to pursue an acting career. Black moved to Los Angeles in 2011 and shared an apartment with fellow Australian actor Tim Campbell.

Black is a vegetarian and she starred in an ad campaign for PETA Asia Pacific in 2007. Black donned a gown made entirely of lettuce leaves. She said that "going vegetarian is a positive step to help stop animal suffering; it's also great for your health and the environment." Black has supported various charities including the Narre Warren Lighthouse Foundation and the Australian Childhood Foundation.

Filmography

References

External links

1982 births
Living people
Actresses from Melbourne
Australian soap opera actresses
21st-century Australian actresses
People from the City of Knox